In 2013 Shelbourne F.C. competed in the League of Ireland Premier Division.

The club

First team coaching and medical staff

First Team Squad 2013

As of March 4, 2013.

Post-2012 season

Transfers In

As of March 4, 2013.

Transfers Out

As of October 26, 2012.

Premier Division

Results

Final table

Summary

Form/Results

Cups

League of Ireland Cup

Leinster Senior Cup

Friendlies

Statistics

As of October 25, 2013.

Player appearances/goals

See also
2013 League of Ireland

References

Shelbourne F.C. seasons
Shelbourne